Holy Trinity Episcopal Church, founded in 1884 and now located at 50 West Strawbridge Avenue in Melbourne, Florida, in the United States, is a historic parish in the Episcopal Diocese of Central Florida. Holy Trinity is the oldest church organization in Melbourne.  Its original church building, now the chapel, is a historic Carpenter Gothic church built in 1886.

Carpenter Gothic chapel
Holy Trinity's original church building, now the chapel, is a historic Carpenter Gothic church built in 1886.  The Rev. Dr. William Porcher DuBose presided over the first service in it on December 27, 1886.  The church was originally located on the south bank of Crane Creek, but was moved north of the creek in the 1890s. In the 1950s a new church and other buildings were erected on Strawbridge Avenue and the old church became the chapel. In 1963 the chapel was moved to its present location on the new church grounds on Strawbridge Avenue.

Gallery

See also
Holy Trinity Episcopal Academy
Holy Trinity Church (disambiguation)

References

External links
Holy Trinity Episcopal Church website
Holy Trinity. Information from the Florida Historical Markers Program website.
 Episcopal Diocese of Central Florida

Churches in Brevard County, Florida
Carpenter Gothic church buildings in Florida
Episcopal church buildings in Florida
Buildings and structures in Melbourne, Florida
1884 establishments in Florida